Azhar Sultan (born 1 April 1961) is a Pakistani former cricketer. He played 44 first-class matches for Sargodha and Pakistan National Shipping Corporation between 1983/84 and 1991/92.

See also
 List of Pakistan National Shipping Corporation cricketers

References

External links
 

1961 births
Living people
Pakistani cricketers
Pakistan National Shipping Corporation cricketers
Sargodha cricketers
Cricketers from Sargodha